The STAR Erasmus Consulting (SEC), formerly known as STAR Erasmus Consultancy Project, is a project of STAR, the study association of the Rotterdam School of Management (RSM), Erasmus University Rotterdam (EUR).  SEC is the largest non-profit student research project in the Netherlands. It is a consultancy project in which tailor-made research is offered to Dutch companies that have an interest in expanding their business to an emerging country. Every year, the SEC project is carried out by 25 carefully selected students of the Rotterdam School of Management (RSM) Erasmus University. Each year, two professors guide the project to uphold  the (academic) quality of the project. In previous years, SEC has completed projects in countries such as China, Mexico, India, the Republic of Korea, Vietnam, Brazil and Thailand.

History 

The history of the STAR Erasmus Consulting dates back to more than thirty years ago. Over the years, the project has evolved and grown into its present state. Back in 1986, it started with the Project Committee investigating Thailand, Singapore and Indonesia. Research in countries such as China, Vietnam, India, Mexico and Malaysia followed before the project was renamed to European Business Study (EBS) in 1992. From then on, the focus was on European upcoming economies like Czechoslovakia, Ukraine, Turkey, Poland and Russia. In the college year 1997-1998 the scope was turned back globally again; the name of the project changed to the International Business Study (IBS).

The first country visited under the new format was South Africa. India, the Philippines, Brazil, China and Thailand were focused on next. India, Malaysia, Mexico, Vietnam, Brazil and the Republic of Korea were both visited twice. In the academic year 2012-2013 the project was renamed to Erasmus Consultancy Project. From then on the project visited Thailand, Chile, Malaysia and Peru. Indonesia will be visited this year.

See also 
 Rotterdam School of Management
 Erasmus University Rotterdam
 STAR Study Association Rotterdam School of Management

External links 
 Erasmus Consultancy Project
 STAR website
 Rotterdam School of Management Erasmus University website
 Erasmus University Rotterdam website

References

Erasmus University Rotterdam